Adrian Smith is a British illustrator, best known for his numerous illustrations for Games Workshop's games. Adrian and Ian Miller are especially well known for their work in the early days of Warhammer and 40k in creating a dark and serious atmospheric setting.

He has also worked in comics producing a number of covers for Toxic! and is working on the French graphic novel series Broz with Pat Mills.

Smith has illustrated cards for the Magic: The Gathering collectible card game.

Bibliography
The Art of Adrian Smith (Black Library, August 2003)
Broz (with Pat Mills):
 "L'arme soeur" (2005)
 "Recherché... Mort ou vif!" (December 2005)
 "Chronicles of Hate Vol. 1" (2014)

Notes

References

 Adrian Smith at the Black Library

External links 
 

Fantasy artists
Game artists
Games Workshop artists
Living people
Year of birth missing (living people)